Bouvart may refer to:

 An alternate spelling of the surname Bouvard
 Michel-Philippe Bouvart (1717–1787), French doctor
 Tom Bouvart, figure skater paired with Coline Keriven
 Léon Bouvart, architect who designed the Palais du Mobilier Bonn Frères in Luxembourg